Rice Creek is a stream in Daviess and DeKalb Counties in the U.S. state of Missouri. It is a tributary of Grindstone Creek.

The stream flows northwest into Dekalb County to its confluence approximately three miles from its source. The confluence is approximately three miles south of Weatherby.

Rice Creek was named after William Rice, a pioneer citizen.

See also
List of rivers of Missouri

References

Rivers of Daviess County, Missouri
Rivers of DeKalb County, Missouri
Rivers of Missouri